The 1977 Wilkes 400 was a NASCAR Winston Cup Series racing event that was held on October 2, 1977, at North Wilkesboro Speedway in North Wilkesboro, North Carolina.

By 1980, NASCAR had completely stopped tracking the year model of all the vehicles and most teams did not take stock cars to the track under their own power anymore.

Background
North Wilkesboro Speedway was a short track that held races in NASCAR's top three series, including 93 Winston Cup Series races. The track, a NASCAR original, operated from 1949, NASCAR's inception, until the track's closure in 1996. The speedway briefly reopened in 2010 and hosted several Stock Car Series races, including the now-defunct ASA Late Model Series, USARacing Pro Cup Series, and PASS Super Late Models, before closing forever in the spring of 2011. The track is located on U.S. Route 421, about five miles east of the town of North Wilkesboro, North Carolina. It measured  and featured a unique uphill backstretch and downhill frontstretch.

Three drivers entered the 1970 Wilkes 400 in a very close points race. Bobby Isaac was just ahead of James Hylton, and Bobby Allison was close behind. But Richard Petty, who was out of the points because of a shoulder injury suffered at Darlington in May, was considered the favorite to win the race. Isaac started from the pole for a record-tying fourth consecutive time, matching Fred Lorenzen and Herb Thomas with a qualifying lap time of 21.346 seconds / 105.406 mph. Fans were given quite a show as Isaac and Petty exchanged the lead a total of 11 times throughout the race. Isaac, in the Nord Krauskopf's K&K Insurance Dodge, led 179 laps and took the win by six car lengths over Petty. Petty, who had started the race in third position led the most laps in the race with 216. Bobby Allison started fourth and finished fourth behind his brother, Donnie Allison. And Hylton finished fifth at the end of day. Isaac advanced to become the 1970 Winston Cup Champion at season's end, with Allison being the runner-up in points.

Bad weather in 1971 caused the Wilkes 400 to be postponed to November 21. Due to the Grand National Series' struggling car counts, cars from NASCAR's Grand American Series were allowed to run in this race. Charlie Glotzbach broke the track record in qualifying at 20.919 seconds / 107.558 mph. It was the first lap ever run under 21 seconds at  North Wilkesboro, ending Bobby Isaac's run of five consecutive poles at the track. Tiny Lund, driving a 1970 Camaro, qualified sixth and led just seven laps on his way to the victory. Lund also won another race driving the Camaro that season at Hickory. Glotzbach finished second, six seconds behind Lund, after leading 76 laps in the race. Richard Petty started from the outside pole and led 306 laps to finish third. Dave Marcis finished fourth, two laps down, and Benny Parsons rounded out the top five. Bobby Allison was the only other driver to lead, running 11 laps out front before losing an engine prior to the half.

The Wilkes 400 in 1972 was one of the wildest finishes in NASCAR Cup Series history. Buddy Baker won the pole in the No. 71 K&K Insurance Dodge owned by Nord Krauskopf, but he only led the first lap of the race. Richard Petty and Bobby Allison swapped the lead for the rest of the race, beating and banging each other for the win. At times was more of a demolition derby than a race. Both cars were destroyed by the end, with Allison's car noticeably smoking. This was the peak of the Petty-Allison rivalry. Petty was declared the winner, but in Victory Lane, a fan tried to attack him. But he was defended by his helmet-wielding brother, Maurice Petty. This was Richard Petty's last of 137 wins in a Plymouth.

In the Gwyn Staley 400 of 1973, Bobby Allison landed on the pole with a qualifying lap of 21.077 seconds / 106.750 MPH. Richard Petty qualified on the outside pole, and in dominating fashion he led 386 laps, winning by over four laps. It was Petty's tenth career win at North Wilkesboro and his 151st career NASCAR victory. Benny Parsons led six laps and finished second. Buddy Baker finished third in the No. 71 K&K Insurance Dodge owned by Nord Krauskopf. Allison lead seven laps and finished fourth in the race. Cecil Gordon rounded out the top five finishers. Yvon DuHamel, a top AMA road racer from Quebec, drove a Mercury prepared by Junie Donlavey and finished in tenth place in his only career Cup race. Twenty of the 30 cars that entered the race were running at the finish.

In the Wilkes 400 of 1973 Bobby Allison, driving for his own No. 12 Coca-Cola team, won the pole position. He and Richard Petty led most of the race, Allison with 161 and Petty with 222. As Petty led the race late, Allison pitted and got fresh tires on a late pit stop, running down Petty and passing him on the final lap. It was considered as one of the most exciting races ever at North Wilkesboro Speedway.

In 1975 the NASCAR Baby Grand Series, later known as Goody's Dash Series, ran its first race at North Wilkesboro, with a win by Dean Combs

Race report
Richard Petty, Darrell Waltrip, Benny Parsons, and Cale Yarborough would constantly compete for the lead in this 400-lap event. After two hours and fifty-nine minutes of racing, Darrell Waltrip would defeat Cale Yarborough by slightly more than seven seconds in front of a live audience of eleven thousand people. There were 26 drivers on the starting grid. Junior Miller withdrew from the race on lap 5 and would become the last-place finisher in the race. Petty looked like he was going to run away with the race until he took a clobbering down the backstretch and was knocked out of the race on lap 240; he was the pole position starter by virtue of driving up to  during his solo qualifying run.

This would become Waltrip's fifth win of the 1977 NASCAR Winston Cup Series season. However, he would not become a credible challenger for the Winston Cup Championship until the 1980s.

Notable crew chiefs who actively participated in the race included Buddy Parrott, Jake Elder, Joey Arrington, Kirk Shelmerdine, Dale Inman, Harry Hyde, and Tim Brewer.

Monetary awards for this event ranged from $12,500 ($ when adjusted for inflation) to a meager $390 ($ when adjusted for inflation). The total prize purse for this racing event was $64,055 ($ when adjusted for inflation).

Qualifying

Results

Timeline
Section reference: 
 Start of race: Richard Petty started the race with the pole position.
 Lap 5: Junior Miller quit the race for personal reasons.
 Lap 77: Darrell Waltrip took over the lead from Richard Petty.
 Lap 105: Richard Petty took over the lead from Darrell Waltrip.
 Lap 113: Darrell Waltrip took over the lead from Richard Petty; Petty took it back on the following lap.
 Lap 114: Ferrel Harris managed to overheat his vehicle, forcing him to exit the event early.
 Lap 136: Darrell Waltrip took the lead from Richard Petty.
 Lap 137: Benny Parsons took over the lead from Darrell Waltrip.
 Lap 148: Richard Petty took over the lead from Benny Parsons.
 Lap 240: Richard Petty had a terminal crash; causing him to withdraw from the event.
 Lap 241: Darrell Waltrip took over the lead from Richard Petty.
 Lap 286: The rear end of J.D. McDuffie vehicle stopped being useful, sending him home early.
 Lap 290: D.K. Ulrich's engine became problematic; forcing him to exit the race prematurely.
 Lap 311: Cale Yarborough took the lead from Darrell Waltrip.
 Lap 312: Darrell Waltrip took the lead from Cale Yarborough.
 Finish: Darrell Waltrip was officially declared the winner of the event.

Post-race standings

References

Wilkes 400
Wilkes
NASCAR races at North Wilkesboro Speedway